Herbert Abbott may refer to:

 Herbert Edward Stacy Abbott (1814–1883), officer in the armies of the East India Company and British Crown in India
 Herbert Abbott (British Army officer) (1855–1939), English cricketer and British Army officer